Holbourne Island National Park is a national park in Queensland (Australia),  northwest of Brisbane.

History 

Holbourne Island became well known in 1875, when 18 survivors of the shipwreck  reached its shores. Four survivors arrived on a damaged port lifeboat on 25 February, where they survived by eating raw bird's eggs and drinking rain water that had pooled in the island rocks. The following day, 14 survivors from a starboard lifeboat also landed. Because rescue was uncertain, the survivors engraved their names on the concave side of a large turtle shell, which is displayed in the South Australian Museum, on North Terrace in Adelaide.

A rescue ship sent looking for survivors of Gothenburg, picked up the group and took them safely to Bowen. The ship subsequently returned to Holbourne Island and rescued the three remaining survivors.

Present day 

As well as being a national park, Holbourne Island is well known as a natural bird sanctuary and turtle nesting area.

On 2 September 2001, the 50,000 gross ton bulk carrier Pax Phoenix departed Hay Point, Queensland bound for India via Singapore. While passing Holbourne Island, an oil slick was noticed and described as being  in width. Although there were concerns about the effect on the island and wildlife, it eventually dispersed naturally out to sea without impact.

Holbourne Island is often referred to as part of the Coral Sea's Bermuda Triangle, as several maritime mysteries are linked to the area.

See also

 Protected areas of Queensland

References

National parks of Queensland
Islands on the Great Barrier Reef
North Queensland
Protected areas established in 1982
1982 establishments in Australia
Uninhabited islands of Australia